Binn Chaonaigh (Irish for "peak of the moss") is one of the Maumturk Mountains of Connemara in County Galway, Ireland. At , it is the fourth-highest of the Maumturks, the 185th-highest peak in Ireland on the Arderin list, and the 223rd-highest on the Vandeleur-Lynam list. It is in the middle sector of the long north-west to south-east spine of the Maumturks.

Geography

Binn Mharig's prominence of  qualifies it as a Vandeleur-Lynam, however its location off the main central ridge of the Maumturks range, mean that it is a less frequented peak.

Máméan Pilgrimage

The pass of Máméan at the base of Binn Chaonaigh has been a site of Christian pilgrimage dedicated to Saint Patrick that goes back to the 5th-century, and before that date, to the pagan festivals of Lughnasadh.  The pilgrimage fell into disrepute in the 19th-century due to local faction-fighting and poitín drinking at the events, and by the mid-1900s had almost died out completely. In 1979, Fr. Micheál MacGréil led the revival of the annual pilgrimage and development of the site. A pilgrimage now takes place three times a year on Saint Patrick's Day, Good Friday, and the first Sunday in August.

The site contains a holy well, a cleft in the rock dug into Binn Chaonaigh known as Saint Patrick's Bed where the Saint reputedly slept, a circle of stones for the Stations of the Cross, and a Mass Rock, which was used during the 18th-century in penal times when Catholicism was outlawed in Ireland.  Fr. MacGréil oversaw the building of a small chapel on the site in the 1980s,  and in 1986, sculpturer Cliodhna Cussen added a statue of Saint Patrick depicted as a shepherd with a sheep at his feet.

The Irish folklorist and translator Máire MacNeill, chronicled various stories of Saint Patrick's arrival at Máméan in 441 AD, and his fights to banish the pagan deity of Crom Dubh, several of which involve Crom taking the form of a bull which ends up being drowned in the lake at Máméan.

Hill walking

The most straightforward way summit Binn Chaonaigh is a 6-kilometre 2-3-hour round-trip via the pass of Maumean; however, because of its positioning on the high rocky central spine of the central Maumturk range, it is also summited in a longer 13-kilometre 5-6 hour loop-route starting at the col of Maumeen and climbing Binn Chaonaigh and then onto the top of Binn idir an dá Log, before descending via Maumahoge, and walking back to Maumeen.

Binn Chaonaigh is also climbed as part of the Maamturks Challenge, a 25-kilometre 10–12 hour walk over the full Maumturks range (from Maam Cross to Leenaun), which is considered one of the "great classic ridge-walks of Ireland", but of "extreme grade" due to the circa 7,600 feet of total ascent.

Since 1975, the University College Galway Mountaineering Club, has run the annual "Maamturks Challenge Walk" (MCW), and man a checkpoint on either side of Binn Chaonaigh; one at Maumeen, and another at Binn idir an dá Log (the summit of Binn idir dá Log marks 54% of MCW climbing completed).

Bibliography

See also

Twelve Bens, major range in Connemara
Mweelrea, major range in Killary Harbour
Lists of mountains in Ireland
Lists of mountains and hills in the British Isles
List of Hewitt mountains in England, Wales and Ireland

References

External links
The Maamturks Challenge, University College Galway Mountaineering Club
The Maamturks Challenge: Routecard (2015)
MountainViews: The Irish Mountain Website, Binn Chaonaigh
MountainViews: Irish Online Mountain Database
The Database of British and Irish Hills , the largest database of British Isles mountains ("DoBIH")
Hill Bagging UK & Ireland, the searchable interface for the DoBIH

Hewitts of Ireland
Mountains and hills of County Galway
Mountains under 1000 metres